NICO Holdings plc is a diversified financial services group and is listed on the Malawi Stock Exchange.

Overview 
NICO Holdings' headquarters are in Blantyre, Malawi, with operating presence in six African countries i.e. Malawi, Zambia, Tanzania, Uganda, Mozambique and Zimbabwe. The group offers a wide range of financial products and services which include: asset management, life assurance, retirement planning, general insurance, health insurance, banking, information technology and property management.

NICO Holdings was founded in 1971 as a short-term insurance company called National Insurance Company Limited. NICO became the first company to be listed on the Malawi Stock Exchange in 1996. Since then, the group has listed two of its subsidiaries on the stock market i.e. NBS Bank Plc in 2007 and ICON Properties Plc in 2019.

Member companies 
The companies that compose the NICO Holdings are organised into five divisions and include, but are not limited, to the following:

Insurance 

 NICO General Insurance Company – Blantyre, Malawi – 51% Shareholding – Offering short term insurance. Remaining 49% held by Sanlam.
 NICO Life Insurance Company Limited – Blantyre, Malawi – 51% Shareholding – Offering long-term and life insurance. Remaining 49% held by Sanlam.
 NICO Insurance (Zambia) Limited – Lusaka, Zambia – 51% Shareholding – Offering short term insurance. Remaining 49% held by Sanlam.
 Sanlam General Insurance Tanzania – Dar es Salaam, Tanzania – 20% Shareholding – Offering General Insurance in Tanzania.
 Sanlam Mozambique Vida Companhia de Seguros, SA – Maputo, Mozambique – 34.30% Shareholding – Offering General Insurance

Banking 

 NBS Bank Plc – Blantyre, Malawi – 50.10% Shareholding – A midsized retail bank licensed by the Reserve Bank of Malawi. The shares of NBS Bank are listed on the MSE.
 Standard Bank Plc – Blantyre, Malawi – 19.89% Shareholding – A commercial bank licensed by the Reserve Bank of Malawi.

Asset Management 

 NICO Asset Managers Limited – Blantyre, Malawi – 100% Shareholding – Offering investment management services.

Technology 

 NICO Technologies Limited – Blantyre, Malawi – 100% Shareholding – Provider of IT solutions to the public sector, corporate and individual clients across Malawi.

Property 

 Group Fabricators & Manufacturers – Blantyre, Malawi – 100% Shareholding – A property holding company.
 ICON Properties Plc – Blantyre, Malawi – 62.71% Shareholding – A property holding company. The shares of ICON Properties Plc are listed on the MSE.
 Eris Properties Malawi Ltd – Blantyre, Malawi – 50% Shareholding – A property development company that owns and manages a number of commercial properties in Malawi. Eris Properties Malawi was founded in August 2017 as a Joint Venture between NICO Holdings and Eris Property Group, a subsidiary of Momentum Metropolitan Holdings.
 Blantyre Hotels plc – Blantyre, Malawi – 34.52% Shareholding – A Malawian based hospitality company. The Company’s hotel operations are managed by Protea Hotels and Inns Limited of South Africa (Protea Hotels) under a management contract.
Other companies where NICO holdings controls more than 5% of the issued equity interest include Sanlam Uganda, Old Mutual, National Bank of Malawi plc, National Investment Trust plc, Telekom Networks Malawi plc, Chibuku Products Limited and Natswitch Limited.

Ownership 
The shares of the stock of NICO Holdings Plc are traded on the Malawi Stock Exchange, under the symbol: NICO. , the shareholding in the company's stock, was as depicted in the table below:

See also 

 Malawi Stock Exchange
 NBS Bank Plc 
 Botswana Insurance Holdings Limited
 Sanlam

References 

Companies listed on Malawi Stock Exchange
1971 establishments in Malawi
Insurance companies of Malawi
Financial services companies established in 1971